The 2004 European Parliament election took place on 12–13 June 2004.

The Olive Tree was the most voted list in Lombardy with 26.3%, followed by Forza Italia (25.7%) and Lega Lombarda–Lega Nord (13.8%).

Results
Source: Ministry of the Interior

2004 elections in Italy 

Elections in Lombardy
European Parliament elections in Italy
2004 European Parliament election